Afreumenes aethiopicus is a species of wasp in the family Vespidae. It was described by Saussure in 1852.

Subspecies
 Afreumenes aethiopicus affinis (Schulthess, 1910)
 Afreumenes aethiopicus aethiopicus (Saussure, 1852)
 Afreumenes aethiopicus longitudinalis Giordani Soika, 1968
 Afreumenes aethiopicus longirostris (Gerst., 1857)

References

Potter wasps
Insects described in 1852